SS Tristram Dalton was a Liberty ship built in the United States during World War II. She was named after Tristram Dalton, an American politician and merchant from Massachusetts. He served a single term as one of the first United States senators, from 1789 to 1791.

Construction
Tristram Dalton was laid down on 6 July 1942, under a Maritime Commission (MARCOM) contract, MCE hull 307, by the Bethlehem-Fairfield Shipyard, Baltimore, Maryland; she was sponsored by Mrs. Gerard A. McCabe, the wife of a yard employee, and was launched on 27 August 1942.

History
She was allocated to A.H. Bull & Co., Inc., on 28 September 1942. On 15 April 1947, she was sold for commercial use to A.H. Bull & Co., Inc. She was scrapped in Taiwan, in 1968.

References

Bibliography

 
 
 
 

 

Liberty ships
Ships built in Baltimore
1942 ships